Macklin Freke (born 6 January 1999), is an Australian professional footballer who plays as a goalkeeper for Brisbane Roar.

Career statistics

Club

Notes

References

External links

1999 births
Living people
Australian soccer players
Association football goalkeepers
Brisbane City FC players
Brisbane Roar FC players
National Premier Leagues players
A-League Men players
Australian people of Dutch descent